Parque Morelos is a public park in Centro, Guadalajara, in the Mexican state of Jalisco.

An equestrian statue of José María Morelos is installed in the park.

References

External links

 

Centro, Guadalajara
Parks in Jalisco